Heris County is located in East Azerbaijan province, Iran. The capital of the county is Heris. At the 2006 census, the county's population was 67,626, in 15,916 households. The following census in 2011 counted 67,820 people, in 18,339 households. At the 2016 census, the county's population was 69,093, in 20,639 households.

Administrative divisions

The population history of Heris County's administrative divisions over three consecutive censuses is shown in the following table. The latest census shows two districts, six rural districts, and five cities.

References

 

Counties of East Azerbaijan Province